Sylvi Palo (1911–1987) was a Finnish stage and film actress.

Selected filmography
 Substitute Wife (1936)
 The Song of the Scarlet Flower (1938)

References

Bibliography 
 Laura Gröndahl. Experiences in Theatrical Spaces: Five Scenographies of Miss Julie. University of Art and Design Helsinki, 2004.

External links 
 

1911 births
1987 deaths
People from Kouvola
People from Viipuri Province (Grand Duchy of Finland)
Finnish stage actresses
Finnish film actresses